Arab localities in Israel include all population centers with a 50% or higher Arab population in Israel. East Jerusalem  and Golan Heights are not internationally recognized parts of Israel proper but have been included in this list.

According to the Israeli Central Bureau of Statistics census in 2010, "the Arab population lives in 134 towns and villages. About 44 percent of them live in towns (compared to 81 percent of the Jewish population); 48 percent live in villages with local councils (compared to 9 percent of the Jewish population). Four percent of the Arab citizens live in small villages with regional councils, while the rest live in unrecognized villages (the proportion is much higher, 31 percent in the Negev)". The Arab population in Israel is located in five main areas: Galilee (54.6% of total Israeli Arabs), Triangle (23.5% of total Israeli Arabs), Golan Heights, East Jerusalem, and Northern Negev (13.5% of total Israeli Arabs). Around 8.4% of Israeli Arabs live in officially mixed Jewish-Arab cities (excluding Arab residents in East Jerusalem), including Haifa, Lod, Ramle, Jaffa-Tel Aviv, Acre, Nof HaGalil, and Ma'alot Tarshiha.

The city of Acre has an Arab minority of 30.1%, while its Old City is 95% Arab. While Arabs constitute 11% of Haifa's total population, they make up 70% of Lower Haifa's residents. In 2011, Jaffa has an Arab population of 30.3%, Lod is 24.3% Arab, while Ramla is 22.2% Arab. In 2015, 23% of the population of Nof HaGalil was Arab.

Central and Haifa Districts
158,900 Arabs live in the Central District, which has a total population of 1,931,000. 237,200 Arabs live in the Haifa District, which has a total population of 939,000.

The majority of the Arab population in these areas live along or near the Green Line which separates Israel from the West Bank in an area known as the "Triangle", split into the "Northern Triangle" (or Wadi Ara) and the "Southern Triangle".

There is a substantial Druze and Christian population in the Carmel region and the Wadi Nisnas neighborhood of Haifa.

Southern Triangle
 Jaljulia: 
 Kafr Bara: 
 Kafr Qasim: 
 Qalansawe: 
 Tayibe: 
 Tira: 
 Zemer:

Northern Triangle
Ar'ara 
Baqa al-Gharbiyye 
al-Arian 
Basma 
Jatt 
Kafr Qara 
Ma'ale Iron 
Meiser 
Umm al-Fahm 
Umm al-Qutuf

Lod
 Lod: 19,800 (estimated population figures for 2011)†

Ramla
 Ramla: 15,100 (Estimated population figures for 2011)†

Haifa and Carmel region
Wadi Nisnas, Halisa, Kababir and Abbas (Haifa neighborhoods)†
Daliyat al-Karmel☆
Ein Hawd
Fureidis
Ibtin
Isfiya☆†
Jisr az-Zarqa
Khawaled
 † Significant presence of Christian population

 ☆ Significant presence of Druze population

Tel Aviv District
18,500 Arabs live in the Tel Aviv District, which has a total population of 1,318,300. 16,000 of them live in Jaffa, where they make up around a third of the population. In 2019 the population of Tel Aviv-Jaffa was 89.9% Jewish, and 4.5% Arabs; among Arabs 82.8% were Muslims, 16.4% were Christians, and 0.8% were Druze.

Jerusalem District
310,700 Arabs live in the Jerusalem District, which has a total population of 987,400. The Arab populations of the Jerusalem District are primarily concentrated in East Jerusalem, which is internationally not considered part of Israel, but there are four other towns that exist within the district's jurisdiction. Abu Ghosh is the largest of them.

West Jerusalem
Abu Ghosh 
Beit Jimal 
Ein Naqquba 
Ein Rafa

East Jerusalem
East Jerusalem was annexed by Israel after its victory over Jordan during the Six-Day War in 1967. East Jerusalem was joined with West Jerusalem, along with several surrounding Palestinian towns and villages. Today, Arabs constitute 61% of the population of East Jerusalem and 38% of that of Jerusalem as a whole. The following are Arab neighborhoods of Jerusalem.

Beit Hanina (al-Jadid or Eastern portion)†
Beit Safafa
Jabel Mukaber
Old City (Armenian, Muslim & Christian Quarters)†
Ras al-Amud
Sheikh Jarrah
Shuafat
Silwan
Sur Baher
At-Tur
Umm Tuba
Wadi al-Joz
al-Walaja

 † Significant presence of Christian population

Southern District
216,200 Arabs live in the Southern District, which has a total population of 1,146,600. The Arab population lives primarily in the northwestern Negev and is entirely composed of Muslim Bedouins. Several towns in the area are not formally recognized by the government and do not receive basic utilities from the state (see unrecognized Bedouin villages in Israel). The largest Arab locality in the Negev is Rahat.

Abu Qrenat
Abu Talul
Ar'arat an-Naqab
Ateer
al-Atrash
Bir Hadaj
Dhahiyah
Drijat
Ghazzah
Hura
Kukhleh
Kuseife
Lakiya
Makhul
Mitnan
Mulada
Qasr al-Sir
Rahat
al-Sayyid
Shaqib al-Salam
Tirabin al-Sana
Tel as-Sabi
Umm Batin

Northern District

705,200 Arabs live in the Northern District, which has a total population of 1,320,800. In 2008, Arabs made up 53% of the Northern District's population, making it Israel's only district with an Arab majority. 44% of the Arab population lives in this district. Nazareth is the largest city, with a population of approximately 66,000.

Abu Sinan☆†
Arab al-Aramshe
Arab al-Subeih
Arab al-Na'im
Arraba†
Basmat Tab'un
Beit Jann☆
Bi'ina†
Bir al-Maksur
Bu'eine Nujeidat
Buqei'a☆†
Daburiyya
Ed Dahi
Deir al-Asad
Deir Hanna†
Dmeide
Eilabun†
Ein al-Asad☆
Ein Mahil
Fassuta†
Hamaam
Hamdon
Hurfeish☆†
Hussniyya
I'billin†
Iksal
Ilut
Jadeidi-Makr
Jish†
Julis☆
Ka'abiyye-Tabbash-Hajajre
Kabul
Kafr Kanna†
Kafr Manda
Kafr Misr
Kafr Yasif†☆
Kamanneh
Kaukab Abu al-Hija
Kfar Kama
Kisra-Sumei☆†
Maghar☆†
Majd al-Krum
Manshiya Zabda
Mashhad
Mazra'a†
Mi'ilya†
Muqeible†
Nahf
Na'ura
Nazareth†
Nein
Rameh†☆
Ras al-Ein†
Rehaniya
Reineh†
Rumana
Rumat al-Heib
Sajur☆
Sakhnin†
Sallama
Sandala
Sha'ab
Shefa-'Amr†☆
Sheikh Danun
Shibli–Umm al-Ghanam
Sulam
Suweid Hamira
Tarshiha†
Tamra City, Akka Subdistrict
Tamra Village, Jezreel sub-district
Tuba-Zangariyye
Tur'an†
Uzeir
Yafa an-Naseriyye†
Yanuh-Jat☆
Yarka☆
Zarzir

 † Significant presence of Christian population († - Christian majority)

 ☆ Significant presence of Druze population (☆ - Druze majority)

Golan Heights
The Golan Heights was captured during the Six-Day War in 1967 and de facto annexed by Israel in 1981. Israel governs the Golan Heights as a part of the Northern District. As a result of the war, many villages were abandoned. The Israeli Head of Surveying and Demolition Supervision for the Golan Heights proposed the demolition of 127 of the unpopulated villages, with about 90 abandoned villages demolished shortly after 15 May 1968. The demolitions were carried out by contractors hired for the job. Five Arab towns remain today. 23,900 Arabs live in the Golan Heights. The area is home to an approximately equal number of non-Arab Israelis.

Buq'ata☆
Ein Qiniyye☆†
Ghajar
Majdal Shams☆†
Mas'ade☆
 ☆ Significant presence of Druze population (☆ - Druze majority)

 † Significant presence of Christian population

See also
 Arab citizens of Israel
 Districts of Israel
 Depopulated Palestinian locations in Israel

Notes

References

 
 
Arab localities in Israel